Jan Leslie (born 20 May 1971) is a Danish handball coach and former player.

Previously he was head coach for Team Esbjerg between 2002 and 2006, and Randers HK from 2009 to 2014, where he won the first Danish Championship in 2012 to the club and qualification for the Women's EHF Champions League, the following season. He also won the 2009–10 Women's EHF Cup, after defeating CBF Elda in the final.

He was hired as new head coach for the new Russian handball club CSKA Moscow, in July 2019. Only two years before he left Russia, after spending three years as head coach for Rostov-Don, where he won the Russian Championship in 2015.

References

Danish handball coaches
Danish male handball players
1971 births
Living people
Danish expatriate sportspeople in Russia
People from Esbjerg
Sportspeople from the Region of Southern Denmark